The Lewis and Clara Anderson House, at 542 S. Main in Manti, Utah, was built in 1896.  It was listed on the National Register of Historic Places in 1998.  The listing included three contributing buildings.

The residence is a two-story, brick building of a central-block-with-projecting-bays type.  It is "an asymmetrically massed Victorian style house, with Queen Anne detailing and
contrasting colors of brick and stone as decorative elements. The house is distinguished by its unusual
massing and arrangement of wings and porches. A carriage house, built c.1920, a chicken coop, built
c.1920, and a garage, built in 1996, are also located on the property. Mature trees, shrubs, lawn, and
flowers are part of a fully landscaped yard."

References

National Register of Historic Places in Sanpete County, Utah
Queen Anne architecture in Utah
Houses completed in 1896